Vallakam, is a village in Vaikom Taluk of Kottayam district in the southern Indian state of Kerala.

Economy
Set in the backdrop of the state's famed backwaters, the economy of Vallakam used to be based on rice and coconut cultivation.  This has undergone a sea-change in recent times due to the near-total discontinuance of rice cultivation as it became economically non-viable and the effect of new parasitic diseases like Mandari and falling coconut prices on coconut cultivation.  As of now, Vallakam's economy is based on what is left of coconut cultivation, newly introduced cash crops like nutmeg (Myristica fragrans) and cacao (Theobroma cacao), remittances sent by people from the village working in other Indian states and abroad and trade.

Demographics
Denominationally, a majority of Hindus along with minority Christians and Muslims makes up the   population of Vallakam. The Hindu population is very diverse, comprising Ezhavas, Nairs and various Dalit communities.  Important places of worship are St. Mary's Church Vallakam, Areekulangara Bhagawati Temple and Thuruvelikunnu Dhruva Temple.  St. Mary's High School is a higher secondary school under the management of St. Mary's Church.

Transportation
Vaikom-Ettumanoor Road which traverses Vallakam is the life-line linking the village with prominent markets like Thalayolaparambu and Kuruppanthara to the East and the municipal town of Vaikom to the West. The village's system of canals too were important in transportation till recent times. These are non-functional now because of large scale 'filling' of them for housing and other purposes and due to the spread of the fresh water weed called in Malayalam 'African payal' (Salvinia molesta) which chokes inland waterways.

References

Villages in Kottayam district